Harlow Hill is a small village and former civil parish, now in the parish of Stamfordham in Northumberland, England. In 1951 the parish had a population of 61.

Harlow Hill lies on the line of Hadrian's Wall, and is the site of Milecastle 16. The Military Road also passes by the village.

Harlow Hill was historically a township in the ancient parish of Ovingham. It became a separate civil parish in 1866.  The civil parish was abolished in 1955, when it was merged with other parishes to create the civil parish of Stamfordham.

References

External links 

Villages in Northumberland
Former civil parishes in Northumberland
Stamfordham